Ada-Rhodes Short is a Canadian mechanical engineer, roboticist, and transgender rights activist. She is the co-host of the podcast Totally Trans: Searching for the Trans Canon alongside writer Henry Giardina. She is a co-founder of Baylor University's first LGBTQ student group. She is a co-creator of Osé, a hands-free device for blended orgasms, which won a 2019 CES Innovation Award in the robotics and drones category.

Education and activism 

In 2010, Short attended Baylor University and attempted to gain recognition for a club to discuss sexuality and combat homophobia. This group became Gamma Alpha Upsilon, Baylor's unofficial LGBTQ student organization. She gained her Bachelor of Science degree in Mechanical Engineering in 2014. She has a Master of Science in Mechanical Engineering from Colorado School of Mines (2016), where she modeled risk for autonomous decision making. Short completed her PhD at Oregon State University under Dr. Bryony DuPont, publishing a dissertation on building a computationally cognitive agent that can handle black swan events. In 2018, Short delivered a speech at the Corvallis Women's March on food instability and housing insecurity in the transgender community. She was the recipient of the 2019 Soroptimists Ruby Award for Women Helping Women in recognition of her mutual aid and activism work. In 2021 Short was involved in the fight against anti-trans legislation in Texas and helped start the protest group Trans Resistance of Texas (TRoT).

Career 

Short worked at Sphero as a mechanical engineer between 2014 and 2017, and co-developed a patented multi-body self-propelled device that was used in the Star Wars BB-8 Robot toy. Then, she was hired as Senior Mechatronic Design Engineer in 2018 by Lora DiCarlo, a sexual technology company, where she worked until 2020. While at Lora DiCarlo, Short co-developed the Osé, a hands-free device for blended orgasms. The Osé won a 2019  CES Innovation Award in the robotics and drones category. The award was rescinded due to a CES policy forbidding indecent companies from exhibiting on the show floor, but later reinstated after CES organizers were accused of sexism.

Selected works 
 Short, Ada-Rhodes. "Autonomous Decision Making Facing Uncertainty, Risk, and Complexity". Oregon State University. Retrieved 14 May 2021.
 Hemphill, Ryan, Kevyn Young, Maxwell Harris, Adam Short, and Douglas L. Van Bossuyt. "Hybrid Additive Manufacturing Method."
 Short, Adam R., and Douglas Lee Van Bossuyt. "Rerouting failure flows using logic blocks in functional models for improved system robustness: failure flow decision functions." In DS 80-6 Proceedings of the 20th International Conference on Engineering Design (ICED 15) Vol 6: Design Methods and Tools-Part 2 Milan, Italy, 27–30.07. 15, pp. 031–040. 2015.
 Short, Ada-Rhodes, Ann D. Lai, and Douglas L. Van Bossuyt. "Conceptual design of sacrificial sub-systems: failure flow decision functions." Research in Engineering Design 29, no. 1 (2018): 23–38.
 Short, Adam R., and Douglas L. Van Bossuyt. "Risk attitude informed route planning in a simulated planetary rover." In International Design Engineering Technical Conferences and Computers and Information in Engineering Conference, vol. 57052, p. V01BT02A048. American Society of Mechanical Engineers, 2015.

References

External links
 

Living people
Year of birth missing (living people)
Baylor University alumni
Oregon State University alumni
American LGBT scientists
21st-century American women scientists
American women engineers
21st-century LGBT people